The Wales men's national field hockey team represents Wales in men's international field hockey competitions.

Wales participated once in the Summer Olympics, the first edition and they won the bronze medal. Since then they participate in the Olympics as a part of the Great Britain squad. In 2021, they qualified for their first ever World Cup in 2023.

Tournament history

Summer Olympics

 1908 –

World Cup
 2023 – 11th place

Commonwealth Games
 1998 – 9th place
 2002 – 7th place
 2014 – 9th place
 2018 – 9th place
 2022 – 6th place

EuroHockey Championship
 1970 – 12th place
 1974 – 8th place
 1978 – 6th place
 1983 – 12th place
 1987 – 12th place
 1991 – 10th place
 1995 – 7th place
 1999 – 6th place
 2019 – 6th place
 2021 – 7th place

Hockey World League
 2012–13 – Did Not Ranked
 2014–15 – Did Not Ranked
 2016–17 – 24th

EuroHockey Championship II
 2005 – 
 2007 – 5th place
 2009 – 
 2011 – 6th place
 2013 – 7th place
 2017 –

EuroHockey Championship III
2015 –

Players

Current squad
Squad for the 2023 Men's FIH Hockey World Cup.

Head coach: Daniel Newcombe

Recent call-ups
The following players have been called up for the national team in the last 12 months.

See also
Wales women's national field hockey team

References

External links

FIH profile

European men's national field hockey teams
National team
Field hockey